The Guinea-Bissau women's national football team represents Guinea-Bissau in international women's football. It is governed by the Football Federation of Guinea-Bissau. It has played in two FIFA-recognised matches, both in 2006 against Guinea. The country also has a national under-17 side which participated in the 2012 Confederation of African Football qualifiers for the FIFA U-17 Women's World Cup. Football is the most popular women's sport in the country. A women's football programme was established in 2004, followed by the creation of a women's national league.

History
In 1985, few countries had women's national football teams. While the sport gained popularity worldwide in the ensuing years, Guinea-Bissau's team only began play more than two decades later. By the end of 2006, the team had played in two FIFA-recognised matches. The first was on 28 October 2006 against Guinea in Bissau, which ended in a 1–1 tie after Guinea-Bissau led 1–0 at half-time. On 12 November 2006, the team played in their second FIFA-recognised match in Conakry, where Guinea-Bissau lost to Guinea 1–3. At the time, the team held three training sessions a week. The team has not participated in some of the major international and regional football competitions, including the Women's World Cup, the 2010 African Women's Championship and the 2011 All-Africa Games.

The team's average FIFA world ranking since 2006 is 119th. Its highest-ever ranking was 92nd in December 2009, and its lowest ranking was 144th in December 2007. Guinea-Bissau's best-ever rise in the rankings came in March 2008, when the team climbed 23 places compared to its previous FIFA ranking. In March 2012, the team was ranked the 135th in the world by FIFA and 30th in the Confederation of African Football (CAF). In June 2012, they moved up five spots to 130th in the world but fell to 33rd in Africa.

Guinea-Bissau has a FIFA recognised under-17 football team, which was established in 2006 but did not play any matches that year. The team competed in the CAF qualifiers for the FIFA U-17 World Cup to be held in Azerbaijan in September 2012. They did not advance beyond regional qualifiers.

Background and development
The development of women's football in Africa faces several challenges, including limited access to education, poverty amongst women, inequalities and human rights abuses targeting women.  Many quality football players leave to seek greater opportunities in Europe or the United States. Funding for women's football in Africa is also an issue with most of the financial assistance for women's football coming from FIFA, and not the national football associations.

Guinea-Bissau won its independence in 1974, the same year its national football federation, Football Federation of Guinea-Bissau, was founded. The federation became a FIFA affiliate in 1986. Women's football is provided for in the constitution of the Football Federation of Guinea-Bissau, and the organisation has four full-time staff members focusing on it.

Football is the country's most popular sport for women, and is supported by football programmes in schools. A national women's football programme was established in 2004. By 2006, the country had  80 total football clubs, five of which were mixed and three of which were for women only. There were 380 registered female players, and a women's teams played in a national football championship. Three years later, there were 24 active women's teams in Guinea-Bissau.

Home stadium

Results and fixtures

 

The following is a list of match results in the last 12 months, as well as any future matches that have been scheduled.

Legend

2022

2023

Coaching staff

Managers

   Lassana Cassamá(???–2021)
  Romão dos Santos(2021–present)

Players

Current squad
The following list is the final squad for 2023 WAFU Zone A Women's Cup in January 2023   .
 Caps and goals accurate up to and including 30 October 2021.

Recent call-ups
The following players have been called up to a Guinea-Bissau  squad in the past 12 months.

Previous squads
WAFU Zone A Women's Cup
2023 WAFU Zone A Women's Cup squads

Records

 Active players in bold, statistics correct as of 2020.

Most capped players

Top goalscorers

Competitive record

FIFA Women's World Cup

Olympic Games

*Draws include knockout matches decided on penalty kicks.

African Games

Africa Women Cup of Nations record

*Draws include knockout matches decided on penalty kicks.

WAFU Women's Cup record

Honours

All−time record against FIFA recognized nations
The list shown below shows the Djibouti national football team all−time international record against opposing nations.
*As of xxxxxx after match against  xxxx.
Key

Record per opponent
*As ofxxxxx after match against  xxxxx.
Key

The following table shows Djibouti's all-time official international record per opponent:

See also

 Sport in Guinea-Bissau
 Football in Guinea-Bissau
 Women's football in Guinea-Bissau

References

External links
FIFA profile

 
National team
African women's national association football teams